BİM Birleşik Mağazalar A.Ş. (BİM for short) is a Turkish retail company, known for offering a limited range of basic food items and consumer goods at competitive prices. Bim were the pioneers of this discount store model in Turkey.

Bim's main competitors are Şok and A101.

Business and activities 
Bim A.Ş. was founded in 1995 by a group of investors around Cuneyd Zapsu. Zapsu sold his shares to the investment bank Merrill Lynch in 2000. Today, the main shareholder is Mustafa Latif Topbaş. At the beginning BİM had only 21 stores, but it expanded thoroughly and by the end of 2015 it counted 4972 and 2019, 7438 stores  by the third quarter of 2021, the company operated 10.330 stores. BİM does not offer franchises, all stores are owned and operated by the company itself, and they are viewed as a competition to the many independent neighborhood stores. The business model is inspired by the German discounter ALDI. 

It also operates 626 stores in Morocco and 320 in Egypt. In 2005 44.12% of its shares were offered to the public.

References 

Companies listed on the Istanbul Stock Exchange
Retail companies established in 1995
Retail companies of Turkey
Discount stores